Lancia is an Italian car manufacturer and a subsidiary of FCA Italy S.p.A., which is currently a Stellantis division. The present legal entity of Lancia was formed in January 2007 when its corporate parent reorganised its businesses, but its history is traced back to Lancia & C., a manufacturing concern founded in 1906 in Torino by Vincenzo Lancia (1881–1937) and Claudio Fogolin. It became part of Fiat in 1969.

The brand is known for its strong rallying heritage, and technical innovations such as the unibody chassis of the 1922 Lambda and the five-speed gearbox introduced in the 1948 Ardea. Despite not competing in the World Rally Championship since 1992, Lancia still holds more Manufacturers' Championships than any other brand.

Sales of Lancia-branded vehicles declined from over 300,000 annual units sold in 1990 to less than 100,000 by 2010. After corporate parent Fiat acquired a stake in Chrysler in 2009, the Lancia brand portfolio was modified to include rebadged Chrysler products, for sale in most European markets. In the United Kingdom and Ireland however, Lancias were rebadged as Chryslers. As sales continued to drop the Lancia-badged Chryslers were no longer offered after 2015. Since then, the company's only product has been the Lancia Ypsilon, and sales outside of Italy ended in 2017. Despite Lancia's much smaller brand presence, the Ypsilon continues to be popular in Italy; in fact it was the second best-selling car there in 2019.

The newly-merged Franco-Italian-American company Stellantis has stated that it will try to revive Italy’s Lancia, with the move also suggesting there will be more than one model for the brand and sales outside of Italy for the first time in years.

History

Lancia family

Cavalier Giuseppe Lancia (1860 (Cuneo) - 1919 (Bordighera) was an Italian businessman and father of Vincenzo Lancia. When he was sixteen he started a business with food in Italy. Later, for a few years, he made relationships with South America and he created a food industry in Argentina. His efforts and innovations made his company a great success. His company was one of the first food companies in the country and showed new methods in this sector. When he made a fortune, he returned to Italy. By his education, Giuseppe was a translator. In 1875, he married Marianna Orazzi. In 1876, their first son Giovanni was born. In 1879 their daughter Margherita was born. She died in 1894. In 1881, their third child, Vincenzo Lancia, was born. Their second daughter, Anna Maria (later Anna-Maria-Giacobinni), was born in 1884.  In their free time, the Lancias  spent their time at a villa  near Turin.

Vincenzo Lancia was born on 24 August 1881 in Fobello near Turin. His father wanted Vincenzo to be a lawyer, but did not have much interest in the humanities. He met the Battista brothers as well as Giovanni Ceirano and became interested in science and technology, especially automobiles. He saw his first cars in Turin and Milan. One of his friends, Carlo Bishareti di Ruffia, had a Benz and that was the first important automobile in his life. When FIAT was founded in 1899, Vincenzo was very active in the company and later became one of the most famous test drivers of Italian automobile brands. In 1922, Vincenzo married his secretary - Adele Miglietti. Vincenzo and Adele had three children: Gianni, Eleonora and Maria. He died on February 15, 1937.

Gianni Lancia  was born on 24 November 1924 in Turin. He finished his education with his sisters at the Technical University of Pisa. From the time he was a little boy Gianni loved sports, but his greatest passion was motor racing. This led him to become a driver for the Lancia team. Gianni became the boss of Lancia in 1950. He invested a lot of money in expensive prototypes and other unprofitable ventures that led him to sell a big part of the company to Carlo Pesenti in 1957. After that he started a business in the food industry. For a few years he lived in Brazil. He had two sons, Mariele and Vincenzo, from his first marriage, and one son, Lorenzo Lancia, from his marriage to Jacqueline Sassard. He died on 30 June 2014.

Foundation and early years

Lancia & C. Fabbrica Automobili was founded on 27 November 1906 in Turin by Fiat racing drivers, Vincenzo Lancia (1881-1937) and his friend, Claudio Fogolin (1872-1945). The first car manufactured by Lancia was the "Tipo 51" or "12 HP" (later called "Alfa"), which remained in production from 1907 to 1908.

In 1910, Lancia components were exported to the United States where they were assembled and sold as SGVs by the SGV Company. In 1915, Lancia also manufactured its first truck, the Jota, that continued as a dedicated series. In 1937, Vincenzo died of a heart attack. His wife, Adele Miglietti Lancia, and his son, Gianni Lancia, took over control of the company. They persuaded Vittorio Jano to join as an engineer. Jano had already made a name for himself by designing various Alfa Romeo models, including some of its most successful race cars ever such as the 6C, P2 and P3.

Lancia is renowned in the automotive world for introducing cars with numerous innovations. These include the Theta of 1913, which was the first European production car to feature a complete electrical system as standard equipment. Lancia's first car adopting a monocoque chassis – the Lambda produced from 1922 to 1931 - featured 'Sliding Pillar' independent front suspension that incorporated the spring and hydraulic damper into a single unit (a feature that would be employed in subsequent Lancias, up to the Appia that was replaced in 1963). In 1948, the first 5-speed gearbox was fitted to a production car (Series 3 Ardea). Lancia premiered the first full-production V6 engine, in the 1950 Aurelia, after earlier industry-leading experiments with V8 and V12 engine configurations. It was also the first manufacturer to produce a V4 engine. Other innovations involved the use of independent suspension in production cars (in an era where live axles were common practice for both the front and rear axles of a car), and rear transaxles, which were first fitted to the Aurelia and Flaminia range. This drive for innovation, constant quest for excellence, fixation of quality, complex construction processes and antiquated production machinery meant that all cars essentially had to be hand-made. With little commonality between the various models, the cost of production continued to rise, while flat demand eventually affected Lancia's viability.

Gianni Lancia, a graduate engineer, was president of Lancia from 1947 to 1955. In 1956, the Pesenti family took over control of Lancia with Carlo Pesenti (1907–1984) in charge of the company.

1969 to 2021

Fiat launched a take-over bid in October 1969. It was accepted by Lancia as the company was losing significant sums of money, with losses in 1969 being 20 million.  This was not the end of the distinctive Lancia marque, and new models in the 1970s such as the Stratos, Gamma and Beta proved that Fiat wished to preserve the image of the brand it had acquired. Autobianchi, bought by Fiat Group just a year before, was put under the control of Lancia.

During the 1970s and 1980s, Lancia had great success in rallying, winning many World Rally Championships.

During the 1980s, the company cooperated with Saab Automobile, with the Lancia Delta being sold as the Saab 600 in Sweden. The 1985 Lancia Thema also shared a platform with the Saab 9000, Fiat Croma and the Alfa Romeo 164. During the 1990s, all models were closely related to other Fiat models.

Starting from 1 February 2007, Fiat's automotive operations were reorganised.
Fiat Auto became Fiat Group Automobiles S.p.A., Fiat S.p.A.'s branch handling mainstream automotive production. Simultaneously the current company, Lancia Automobiles S.p.A., was created from the pre-existing brand, and controlled 100% by FCA.
In 2011, Lancia moved in another direction and added new models manufactured by Chrysler and sold under the Lancia badge in many European markets, such as the 300 (named Thema), 200 Convertible (as Flavia) and Voyager. Conversely, Lancia-built models began to be sold in right-hand drive markets under the Chrysler badge.

In 2015 Lancia's parent company Fiat Group Automobiles S.p.A. became FCA Italy S.p.A., reflecting the earlier incorporation of Fiat S.p.A. into Fiat Chrysler Automobiles.

After 2015, all models produced by Chrysler were discontinued in the European market. Since then, the Lancia brand has remained alive, only by continuing to manufacture and sell the Ypsilon - which received another slight facelift in 2020 - exclusively in the Italian market.

2021-present - Relaunch under Stellantis

Despite doubts about the brand's future following the completion of the Stellantis merger in 2021, Lancia was made part of a joint group with sister companies Alfa Romeo and DS Automobiles, to develop new premium models for the 2024 model year. As part of Stellantis' recovery plan for Lancia, Luca Napolitano was appointed the car maker's CEO, and Jean-Pierre Ploué its chief designer.

Three new electric models were announced in June 2021: a replacement city car for the Ypsilon; a compact crossover (codenamed L74 and rumoured to be named the Aurelia); and a compact hatchback, likely to be a new Delta.

In late 2021, Luca Napolitano and Jean-Pierre Ploué celebrated Lancia’s 115th anniversary with a docufilm entitled Elegance on the move.

In November 28th, 2022, Luca Napolitano laid the cornerstone of Lancia's "renaissance" by revealing a new logo and introducing the new Pu+Ra (Pure + Radical) Design language - through a sculpture called Pu+Ra Zero. Inspired by historic models such as the Aurelia, Flaminia, Delta and the 1970 Stratos Zero concept car, future electric models will be adorned by both organic lines and geometric shapes at the same time. The iconic calice grille was reinterpreted as a new Y-shaped LED light signature, with the new wordmark above them, instead of the shield. At the rear, round taillights pays homage directly to the Stratos sports car.

Automotive

Current car models

Lancia Ypsilon

The Ypsilon is a premium 5-door supermini car produced since 2011. It is based on an updated Fiat 500 platform. It was previously available for sale in many European markets; however, since 2017, it has only been available in Italy. In the United Kingdom and Ireland it was previously sold as the Chrysler Ypsilon.

Although it is the only Lancia car in production and only for sale in Italy, the Ypsilon continues to be popular there; it was the second best-selling car in Italy in 2019.

Past car models

Historical models
The Lancia Aurelia introduced the front engine rear transmission configuration later used by Ferrari, Alfa Romeo, Porsche, GM, Volvo and Maserati, as well as the V6 engine, which is now common. It had inboard rear brakes, an important way of reducing un-sprung weight.

The Lancia Stratos was a successful rally car during the 1970s, and helped the company to improve its sporting credentials.

Chrysler-derived models
The second generation Lancia Thema executive car (2011 – 2014) was a re-branded second generation Chrysler 300 unveiled in 2011 to replace the Thesis. It reused the name of the Italian made 1984–94 Thema saloon. It used to be available in various European markets, but for the United Kingdom and Ireland it was only sold as the Chrysler 300C. It was discontinued in 2015.

The Lancia Voyager was a large MPV unveiled in 2011, which was based on the Chrysler Town & Country. It was marketed in various European markets, but for the United Kingdom and Ireland it was only sold as the Chrysler Grand Voyager. It was discontinued in 2015.

Between 2012 and 2014, the Chrysler 200 Convertible was rebranded and marketed under the Lancia Flavia name. The Flavia was only available in left-hand drive markets, and thus not sold in the United Kingdom or Ireland.

Concept cars

Lancia has shown several concept cars to the public including the Flaminia Loratmo (1958), Stratos Zero (1970), the Megagamma by Italdesign Giugiaro and Sibilo by Bertone in 1978, Hit (1988) by Pininfarina, the Bertone-designed Kayak (1995), the Dialogos (1998) and Nea in 2000. The company showed the Granturismo Stilnovo and Fulvia concepts in 2003.

Special cars
In the end of 1960, Lancia made their first landaulet-limousine for the President of Italy, called the Lancia Flaminia 335 Presidenziale.

In 1989, Lancia made a limousine version of the Thema. 24 examples for Fiat-Group executives.

In 1999, Lancia made a one-off limousine version of the Kappa and at the 2004 Geneva Motor Show, Stola showed a limousine version of the Thesis.

Export markets
In January 2014, in an interview with La Repubblica, Fiat CEO Sergio Marchionne foreshadowed that Lancia would become an Italy–only brand, and focus only on the Ypsilon supermini range.

United States
While some models had been imported on a small scale during the 1950s to the 1960s, Lancias were sold in the United States from 1975. Sales were comparatively slow, and the range was withdrawn at the same time as Fiat in 1982.

In 2009, following Fiat's acquisition of a stake in United States-based Chrysler and part of Chrysler's restructuring plans, it was stated that Fiat plans for the Chrysler brand and Lancia to co–develop products, with some vehicles being shared. Olivier Francois, Lancia's CEO, took over as CEO of the Chrysler division in October 2009. Fiat also announced that, depending on the market, some Chrysler cars would be sold as Lancias and vice versa.

Francois' plans to re-establish the Chrysler brand as an upscale brand were somewhat muddied by the discontinuance of the Plymouth brand. At the 2010 Detroit Auto Show, a Chrysler-badged Lancia Delta was on display, but this did not result in sales in the United States, with proposals to instead modify an Alfa Romeo for sale by 2013.

United Kingdom
Lancia's reputation was significantly undermined in 1980, when defective Lancia Beta models, suffering from significant suspension sub-frame corrosion problems, were purchased back from owners by the company in a highly publicised campaign. These cars were later crushed. The brand never recovered from the damage inflicted during the Beta recall and, combined with a range of related factors (including poor residual values, which made their range uncompetitive), decided to withdraw from the United Kingdom (and other right-hand drive markets) in February 1994. The last model to be sold in the United Kingdom was the Delta, boosted by its rallying reputation, withdrawn from sale in 1995, although a small number of left-hand drive Lancia models have since reached the UK as personal imports.

After 1995, there were continuous rumours suggesting Lancia's return to the United Kingdom. In November 2005, What Car? reported rumours over the alleged return, to rival "affordable" premium makes, such as Saab and Volvo. In September 2006, What Car? reported that Lancia were returning to the United Kingdom. The relaunch date was set for August 2008. In April 2008, Car reported that Lancia had postponed the relaunch. In June 2009, Autocar reported that the relaunch of Lancia was now “very unlikely”.

These rumours were credible since Lancia models, by that time, shared common parts with Fiat and Alfa Romeo models that were imported, sold and maintained by an existing dealership network. The cost to reestablish the brand would therefore be minimal. In December 2008, however, Fiat cancelled relaunch plans, due to financial concerns coinciding with the global financial crisis, and the recession.

In 2011, Lancia Ypsilon and Delta models were eventually reintroduced to the United Kingdom, but were sold under the Chrysler marque. In January 2014, the slow-selling Delta model was dropped from this line-up. In March 2015, Fiat Group announced that the Chrysler brand would be discontinued in the United Kingdom in 2017, citing a desire to focus largely on the Jeep brand instead.

Japan
A small number of Lancia models were previously sold in Japan, such as Fulvia, Stratos and Delta. More recently, some models have been sold under the Chrysler brand, such as the Ypsilon.

Lancia in motorsport

Formula One

After Vincenzo Lancia's son Gianni became director of the firm, it started to take part more frequently in motorsport, eventually deciding to build a Grand Prix car. Vittorio Jano was the new designer for Lancia and his Lancia D50 was entered into the 1954 Spanish Grand Prix, where Alberto Ascari took the pole position and drove the fastest lap. In the 1955 Monaco Grand Prix Ascari crashed into the harbour after missing a chicane. One week later Ascari was killed in an accident driving a Ferrari sports car at Monza. With Ascari's death and Lancia's financial problems the company withdrew from Grand Prix racing. Altogether Lancia took two victories and ten podiums in Formula One.

Remnants of the Lancia team were transferred to Scuderia Ferrari, where Juan Manuel Fangio won the 1956 championship with a Lancia-Ferrari car.

Rallying

Lancia has been very successful in motorsport over the years, and mostly in the arena of rallying. Prior to the forming of the World Rally Championship (WRC), Lancia took the final International Championship for Manufacturers title with the Fulvia in 1972. In the WRC, they remain the most statistically successful marque (despite having withdrawn at the end of the 1993 season), winning constructors' titles with the Stratos (1974, 1975 and 1976), the 037 (1983) and the Delta (six consecutive wins from 1987 to 1992). The Delta is also the most successful individual model designation ever to compete in rallying. All this gave Lancia a total of 11 Championships over the years and 15 European Championship from 1969 to 1992.

Juha Kankkunen and Miki Biasion both won two drivers' titles with the Delta. Among other drivers to take several World Rally Championship wins with Lancia were Markku Alén, Didier Auriol, Sandro Munari, Bernard Darniche, Walter Röhrl, Björn Waldegård and Henri Toivonen. The history of the brand in rallying is also tainted with tragedy, with deaths of Italian driver Attilio Bettega at the 1985 Tour de Corse in a Lancia 037 and then Finnish championship favourite Toivonen in a Lancia Delta S4 at the same rally exactly a year later. These deaths would eventually lead to the end of Group B rallying.

Sports car racing
In 1951 Mille Miglia, Lancia Aurelia B20 GT came second overall. The car was driven by Thornley Kelham. 

In 1953, Umberto Maglioli won the Targa Florio at the wheel of the Lancia D20. The same year Lancia introduced the D24 sports racer, which was an evolution of D23 model, but rebodied as a spider by Pinin Farina. Its most significant victories were the 1953 Carrera Panamericana, the 1954 Mille Miglia and the 1954 Targa Florio.

During Lancia's dominance of rallying, the company also expanded into sports cars in the late 1970s until the mid-1980s. It first ran the Stratos HF in Group 4, and for a brief interlude with a rare Group 5 version. The car was replaced with the successful Beta Montecarlo Turbo winning the FIA's 1980 World Championship for Makes and 1981 World Endurance Championship for Makes and the 1980 Deutsche Rennsport Meisterschaft.

In 1982 the team moved up to Group 6 with the LC1 Spyder, followed by the Group C LC2 coupé which featured a Ferrari powerplant in 1983. The LC2 was a match for the standard-setting Porsche 956 in terms of raw speed, securing 13 pole positions over its lifetime; however, its results were hampered by poor reliability and fuel economy, and it only managed to win three European and World Endurance Championship races. The team's inability to compete against the dominant Porsche 956 and 962 sports cars led it to drop out of sportscar racing at the end of 1986 in order to concentrate on rallying, although private teams continued to enter LC2s with declining results until the early 1990s.

Titles
1979 World Championship for Makes (under 2-litre division)
1980 World Championship for Makes (overall)
1981 World Endurance Championship for Makes (overall)
1980 Deutsche Rennsport Meisterschaft

Commercial vehicles
Lancia produced a wide range of vans, trucks, buses and military vehicles from the beginning, forming Lancia Veicoli Industriali in 1912. Lancia slowly withdrew from the commercial sectors during the late 1960s and production of commercial vehicles ended in the early 1970s, shortly after Fiat's takeover of the company, with some models transferred to Iveco.

Light commercial vehicles
 1958 Lancia Ardea Furgoncino (van), Cassone (pick-up) 
 1950 Lancia Beta 
 1953 Lancia Appia Furgoncino (van), Camioncino (pick-up) 
 1959 Lancia Jolly
 1963 Lancia Superjolly

Heavy commercial vehicles

 1915 Lancia Jota
 1915 Lancia Djota
 1921 Lancia Triota
 1921 Lancia Tetrajota
 1924 Lancia Pentajota
 1926 Lancia Esajota
 1927 Lancia Eptajota
 1932 Lancia Ro
 1935 Lancia Ro-Ro
 1938 Lancia 3Ro
 1943 Lancia Esaro
 1941 Lancia E290  electric truck, 202 built (E290 & E291) (La Lancia 3rd Ed, p.431, Wim Oude Weerink)
 1947 Lancia 6Ro
 1947 Lancia Esatau
 1957 Lancia Esatau B
 1959 Lancia Esadelta
 1963 Lancia Esadelta B
 1967 Lancia Esadelta C
 1969 Lancia Esagamma

Buses
 1919 Lancia Eptaiota 
 1920 Lancia Trijota (bus)
 1922 Lancia Tetraiota
 1925 Lancia Pentaiota
 1927 Lancia Omicron 
 1934 Lancia Ro (bus)
 1947 Lancia Esatau (bus)
 1949 Lancia Esatau (bus) V11
 1953 Lancia Esatau (bus) V81
 1957 Lancia Esatau (bus) 703
 1964 Lancia Esagamma (bus) 715/718

Trolleybuses
 1951 Lancia Esatau Pistoiesi
 1956 Lancia Esatau Piaggio Ansaldo
 1961 Lancia Esatau V.11 (trolleybus)
 1966 Lancia Diafa trolleybus
 1967 Lancia Bimax
 1968 Lancia Bimax F600
 1968 Lancia Pistoiesi
 1969 Lancia Menarini Monocar
 1969 Lancia Esatau P Casaro

Military vehicles

 1912 Lancia 1Z (light truck)
 1912 Lancia 1ZM (armoured car)
 1938 Lancia 3Ro (truck)
 1942 Lancia Esaro (truck)
 1942 Lancia Lince (armoured car)
 1948 Lancia Esatau 6RoM (truck)
 1951 Lancia CL51 (Z 20) (troop transporter)
 1954 Lancia TL51 (Z 30) (truck)
 1960 Lancia 506 (truck)
 1975 Lancia ACL 75 (6611 M) (truck)
 1990 Lancia ACL 90 (truck, later Iveco) (truck)

Tractor 
 1947 Lancia 3Ro (based on Fiat)

Other

 2007 Lancia Bike
 2009 Lancia di Lancia speedboat

Engines

 Lancia Flat-4 engine
 Lancia V4 engine
 Lancia V6 engine
 Lancia V8 engine
 Lancia Tipo 4

The company has also made industrial engines.

Logo
1907
From 1907 to 1910 Lancia cars didn't bear a true badge, but rather a brass plaque identifying the manufacturer (Lancia & C.) and chassis code; although some models did have a brass Lancia script on the grille.

1911
The original Lancia logo was designed by Count Carlo Biscaretti di Ruffia.
In 1910 Vincenzo Lancia asked Biscaretti di Ruffia to design a badge for the company: the Count submitted six watercolour proposal sketches. Vincenzo Lancia chose a round one, composed by a blue lance and flag bearing a Lancia script ("Lancia" means "lance" in Italian) in gold, over a four-spoke steering wheel, with a hand throttle detail on the right spoke. The first car to bear the Lancia logo was the Gamma 20 HP in 1911.

1929
In 1929 the logo acquired its final layout: the previous round badge was superimposed on a blue shield in the shape of a Reuleaux triangle (as found in one of Biscaretti di Ruffia's six original proposals). Though first applied on the 1929 Dikappa, this badge was only used consistently starting with the 1936 Aprilia.

1957
Beginning with the 1957 Flaminia, Lancia cars switched from the traditional vertical split grille to a horizontal, full-width one. The logo was moved inside the grille opening, and changed to a more stylized chromed metal open-work design; shield and steering wheel became chrome frames, the only remaining enameled surface being the blue field of the flag. This new metal logo was used on most models with some exceptions, namely Zagato-bodied Lancia Fulvias and Flavias, the Lancia 2000 Berlina (which reprised the traditional upright grille and the round enameled badge) and the Stratos HF (whose ornaments lacked the triangular shield).

1974
In 1974 the badge was redesigned on Umberto Agnelli's request; it went back to a modernised silver, white and blue version of the 1929 design. Flag and lance were unified in a single shape and dispensed with the earlier minute detailing, the Lancia letters became all of the same size, and the steering wheel became also outlined in blue and lost the hand throttle detail. This logo debuted on the 1979 Lancia Delta, and made its way on the other models as they adopted the split grille introduced by the Delta. Though lightly revised in 2000 with the addition of a chrome shield surround, the 1974 logo was used through four decades, up to 2006.

2007
A redesigned logo, designed by Robilant Associati, was presented at the 2007 Geneva Motor Show—a couple of months after the creation of Lancia Automobiles. While the traditional chrome-framed blue shield has been retained and made three-dimensional, for the first time since 1911 lance and flag are absent; the steering wheel has been stylized into a chromed circle, from which two spikes converge towards the modern Lancia logotype in the centre.

2022
The current logo was unveiled in late 2022, as part of Lancia's newest design language dubbed Pu+Ra. The logo retains the colour scheme of the 2007 logo, while also reinstating and streamlining the flag, circle and lance theme of the 1957 logo.

Media and sponsorship

In 2009, the British motoring television show Top Gear suggested that Lancia had more 'great' models than any other car company. The presenters went on to test the Gamma Coupé, Fulvia Coupé, Aprilia, Montecarlo, Beta Coupé, HPE, Stratos, 037, Delta Integrale Evo II and Thema 8.32. They also stated during their review that Lancia made the best-looking cars, even though they are unreliable.

Lancia sponsored the Venice Film Festival for five years, ending in 2012, with the Lancia Thema used to transport stars to the festival. Lancia was sponsor of the ninth and eleventh World Summits of Nobel Peace Prize Laureates.

See also

 List of automobile manufacturers
 List of Formula One constructors
 List of Italian companies
 List of World Rally Championship Constructors' Champions
 Martini Racing

References

Further reading

External links

 

 Lancia models production

 
Stellantis
Turin motor companies
Defunct bus manufacturers
Defunct truck manufacturers
Trolleybus manufacturers
Vehicle manufacturing companies established in 1906
Italian companies established in 1906
Italian brands
Italian auto racing teams
Italian racecar constructors
World Sportscar Championship teams
Formula One constructors
Formula One entrants
Car manufacturers of Italy
Luxury motor vehicle manufacturers
Sports car manufacturers